Mantorville is a city in Dodge County, Minnesota,  United States.  The population was 1,197 at the 2010 census. It is the county seat of Dodge County.  Founded in 1854, the city is one of the oldest in Minnesota.

Mantorville shares a school system with nearby Kasson, Minnesota (the "K–M Komets").  The K–M school system is a member of the Zumbro Education school district (ZED).

Minnesota State Highway 57 serves as a main route in the city.

History
It is known as the source of Mantorville limestone, which found its way into buildings across the United States. The limestone quarried in the area was soft and easily carved when first extracted, but became harder as it endured the elements, making it a long-lasting building material. The historic Hubbell House used the stone in 1856, and it was likewise used in 1865 for the Dodge County Courthouse, designed by E. Townsend Mix and now the oldest working courthouse in Minnesota.

Mantorville is named for Peter and Riley Mantor, brothers who came to the settlement in 1853. The Mantorville Historic District, which covers both sides of Minnesota Highway 57 and 5th Street, was added as a historic district to the National Register of Historic Places in 1974.

Demographics

2010 census
As of the census of 2010, there were 1,197 people, 430 households, and 331 families residing in the city. The racial makeup of the city was 97.6% White, 0.2% African American, 0.4% Native American, 0.1% Asian, 0.8% from other races, and 0.9% from two or more races. Hispanic or Latino people of any race were 2.8% of the population.

There were 430 households, of which 41.4% had children under the age of 18 living with them, 65.8% were married couples living together, 8.1% had a female householder with no husband present, 3.0% had a male householder with no wife present, and 23.0% were non-families. 18.6% of all households were made up of individuals, and 6.3% had someone living alone who was 65 years of age or older. The average household size was 2.78 and the average family size was 3.18.

The median age in the city was 37.8 years. 29.1% of residents were under the age of 18; 6.3% were between the ages of 18 and 24; 26.4% were from 25 to 44; 27.2% were from 45 to 64; and 10.9% were 65 years of age or older. The gender makeup of the city was 50.6% male and 49.4% female.

2000 census
As of the census of 2000, there were 1,054 people, 371 households, and 286 families residing in the city. The racial makeup of the city was 98.48% White, 0.57% Native American, 0.19% Asian, 0.09% from other races, and 0.66% from two or more races. Hispanic or Latino people of any race were 0.76% of the population.

There were 371 households, out of which 45.3% had children under the age of 18 living with them, 68.5% were married couples living together, 5.7% had a female householder with no husband present, and 22.9% were non-families. 18.6% of all households were made up of individuals, and 8.6% had someone living alone who was 65 years of age or older.  The average household size was 2.84 and the average family size was 3.26.

In the city, the population was spread out, with 32.3% under the age of 18, 5.6% from 18 to 24, 34.5% from 25 to 44, 19.9% from 45 to 64, and 7.7% who were 65 years of age or older.  The median age was 33 years. For every 100 females, there were 99.6 males.  For every 100 females age 18 and over, there were 99.4 males.

The median income for a household in the city was $55,735, and the median income for a family was $62,625. Males had a median income of $39,167 versus $29,464 for females. The per capita income for the city was $20,853.  About 6.2% of families and 6.4% of the population were below the poverty line, including 6.6% of those under age 18 and 15.3% of those age 65 or over.

Geography
Mantorville is located along the South Branch of the Middle Fork of the Zumbro River, west of Rochester, Minnesota.

Notable people
 Edwin Osgood Grover (1870–1965), educator and publisher, Professor of Books at Rollins College
 Eulalie Osgood Grover (1873–1958), author of Sunbonnet Babies and 26 other children's books that sold over 4 million copies
 Oliver J. Holtan (1891-1971), Minnesota state legislator, farmer, and businessman

References

External links

 Mantorville, Minnesota Official Website
 Mantorville Walking Tour, with profiles of historic buildings

Cities in Minnesota
Cities in Dodge County, Minnesota
Zumbro River
County seats in Minnesota
Rochester metropolitan area, Minnesota
Historic districts on the National Register of Historic Places in Minnesota
National Register of Historic Places in Dodge County, Minnesota